Żołędowo  is a village in the administrative district of Gmina Osielsko, within Bydgoszcz County, Kuyavian-Pomeranian Voivodeship, in north-central Poland. It is located in the historic region of Kuyavia.

The village has a population of 920.

The historic landmarks of Żołędowo are the Karłowski Palace and the Exaltation of the Holy Cross church.

History
During the German occupation (World War II), in 1939, the occupiers carried out arrests of local Poles, who were then murdered by the German Einsatzkommando 16 near Otorowo as part of the Intelligenzaktion. In 1944, the Germans burned the bodies of the victims in attempt to cover up the crime.

Gallery

References

Villages in Bydgoszcz County